The Amur catfish, or Japanese common catfish, Silurus asotus, is a species of catfish (sheatfish), family Siluridae. It is a large freshwater fish found in continental East Asia and in Japan. It prefers slow-flowing rivers, lakes, and irrigation canals. Its appearance is typical of a large silurid catfish. Larval S. asotus specimens have three pairs of barbels (one maxillary, two mandibular), while adult fish have only two pairs (one maxillary, one mandibular); second pair of mandibular barbels degenerates.

Culinary use 
In Korean cuisine, the fish is called megi and is used to boil maeun-tang (spicy fish soup).

References
Bibliography
 
Notes

Silurus
Catfish of Asia
Fish of East Asia
Freshwater fish of China
Freshwater fish of Japan
Fish of Mongolia
Fish of Russia
Freshwater fish of Taiwan
Fish described in 1758
Taxa named by Carl Linnaeus